The Iraq Davis Cup team represents Iraq in Davis Cup tennis competition and are governed by the Iraqi Tennis Federation.

Iraq currently compete in the Asia/Oceania Zone of Group IV.  They competed in Group II from 1988-1990, but failed to advance beyond the first round.

History
Iraq competed in its first Davis Cup in 1988.

Current team (2022) 

 Akram M Abdalkarem Al-Saadi
 Adil Mustafa Al-Saedi
 Abdullah Ali Hatem Ghrairi
 Mohammed Al-Shammari
 Ali Al-Mayahi

See also
Davis Cup
Iraq Fed Cup team

External links

Davis Cup teams
Davis Cup
Davis Cup